Ik Yang or Yang Lianhui (born March 28, 1985, Dalian, China) is a Chinese professional light welterweight boxer and a former title challenger. He held the South Korea, WBO China Zone, WBO Asia Pacific lightweight and IBF Pan Pacific light welterweight titles.

Professional career

Yang did not start with a notable amateur pedigree as was the case for many Chinese fighters. He made his professional debut in 2007, winning the South Korea lightweight title in 2012 against journeyman Jon Won Won in his ninth fight. In his following fight with Elly Ray, he won the relatively new WBO China Zone lightweight title via an eighth round technical knockout.

In 2014 he stopped Sukkasem Kietyongyuth in eight rounds to win the WBO Asia Pacific lightweight title. Later that year he moved up to the light welterweight division and stopped Thai veteran Fahsai Sakkreerin to win the IBF Pan Pacific light welterweight title which he would later successfully defend against another Thai veteran, Patomsuk Pathompothong via a sixth round technical knockout in his first twelve round fight.

On July 18, 2015 Yang fought for the vacant IBF light welterweight title against long time veteran César Cuenca, suffering his first professional defeat via unanimous decision in a fight where both fighters suffered knockdowns.

Professional record

|- style="margin:0.5em auto; font-size:95%;"
| style="text-align:center;" colspan="8"|19 Wins (14 Knockouts), 1 Defeats, 0 Draws
|-  style="text-align:center; margin:0.5em auto; font-size:95%; background:#e3e3e3;"
|  style="border-style:none none solid solid; "|Res.
|  style="border-style:none none solid solid; "|Record
|  style="border-style:none none solid solid; "|Opponent
|  style="border-style:none none solid solid; "|Type
|  style="border-style:none none solid solid; "|Rd., Time
|  style="border-style:none none solid solid; "|Date
|  style="border-style:none none solid solid; "|Location
|  style="border-style:none none solid solid; "|Notes
|- align=center
|Loss
|19-1
|align=left| Cesar Cuenca
|
|
|
|align=left|
|align=left|
|- align=center
|Win
|19-0
|align=left| Patomsuk Pathompothong
|
|
|
|align=left|
|align=left|
|- align=center
|Win
|18-0
|align=left| Fahsai Sakkreerin
|
|
|
|align=left|
|align=left|
|- align=center
|Win
|17-0
|align=left| Sukkasem Kietyongyuth
|
|
|
|align=left|
|align=left|
|- align=center
|Win
|16-0
|align=left| Sayan Sirimongkhon
|
|
|
|align=left|
|align=left|
|- align=center
|Win
|15-0
|align=left| Geisler AP
|
|
|
|align=left|
|align=left|
|- align=center
|Win
|14-0
|align=left| Hero Tito
|
|
|
|align=left|
|align=left|
|- align=center

See also
Boxing in China

References

External links

|-

|-

|-

Chinese male boxers
Light-welterweight boxers
1985 births
Living people
Sportspeople from Dalian
Manchu sportspeople